Wilmar Sugar Australia is a subsidiary of the Singapore-based company Wilmar International that incorporates sugar production business and renewable energy cogeneration. The principal product of Wilmar Sugar is raw sugar. By-products from the production of sugar include molasses (which is used to produce ethanol) and bagasse (which is used to generate electricity). It is Australia’s largest biomass renewable energy generator.

History 
The Company originates in the 1855 Colonial Sugar Refining Company, renamed CSR Limited in 1873. In 2009, CSR Limited created Sucrogen to handle its sugar activities then sold it to Wilmar International on 31 March 2010 for US$1.47 billion. Sucrogen sponsored the 2010 Sucrogen Townsville 400, and the 2011 Sucrogen Ayr Show. Wilmar subsequently renamed Sucrogen to Wilmar Sugar.

Mills 
Wilmar Sugar operates the following sugar mills in Queensland:
 Macknade Sugar Mill in Macknade, Shire of Hinchinbrook
 Victoria Sugar Mill at Victoria Plantation, Shire of Hinchinbrook
 Invicta Sugar Mill at Giru, Shire of Burdekin
 Kalamia Sugar Mill at Brandon, Shire of Burdekin
 Pioneer Sugar Mill at Brandon, Shire of Burdekin
 Inkerman Sugar Mill at Home Hill, Shire of Burdekin
 Proserpine Sugar Mill at Proserpine, Whitsunday Region
 Plane Creek Sugar Mill at Sarina, Mackay Region

See also 
 List of sugar mills in Queensland

References

External links 

 Wilmar Sugar Australia Pty Ltd
 Wilmar International Sugar Milling
Agriculture companies of Singapore
Sugar companies of Australia
Food and drink companies established in 1855
Sugar industry in Australia
1855 establishments in Australia